Events from the year 1950 in Taiwan, Republic of China. This year is numbered Minguo 39 according to the official Republic of China calendar.

Incumbents
 President – Chiang Kai-shek
 Vice President – Li Zongren
 Premier – Yan Xishan, Chen Cheng
 Vice Premier – Chu Chia-hua, Chang Li-sheng

Events

March
 1 March – Chiang Kai-shek resumes his duties as Chinese president after moving his government to Taipei, Taiwan.

June
 18 June – The execution of Chen Yi after believed that he had defected from Kuomintang to the Chinese Communist Party.

August
 16 August – The establishment of Yilan County from part of Taipei County.

October
 21 October – The establishment of Nantou County Government.

Births
 25 January – Chen Cheng-sheng, member of Legislative Yuan (1999–2002).
 5 February – Wei Yao-chien, member of Legislative Yuan (1990–1996).
 10 March – David Lin, Minister of Foreign Affairs (2012–2016).
 11 March – Tsai Chuen-horng, Minister and Chairman of Atomic Energy Council (2008–2016).
 24 March – Shih Yen-shiang, Minister of Economic Affairs (2009–2013).
 6 April – Tsai Ming-kai, entrepreneur.
 9 May – Chiou I-jen, Vice Premier of the Republic of China (2007–2008).
 17 May – Hsieh Fa-dah, Vice Minister of Economic Affairs (2006–2008).
 10 June – Chen Chu, Mayor of Kaohsiung City.
 25 June – Chang Chia-juch, Minister of Economic Affairs (2013–2014).
 26 July – Chang Wen-ying, Mayor of Taichung (1997–2001).
 21 July – Chiu Wen-ta, Minister of Health and Welfare (2013–2014).
 12 October – Chen Shui-bian, President of the Republic of China (2000–2008).
 2 November – Shue Ming-fa, cycling athlete.
 8 December – Hsieh Shou-shing, Minister of Atomic Energy Council.
 24 December – Andrew Hsia, Minister of Mainland Affairs Council (2015–2016).

Deaths
 10 June – Zhu Feng, 45, People's Republic of China spy.
 18 June – Chen Yi, 67, Chief Executive of Taiwan.

References

 
Years of the 20th century in Taiwan